Amazing Spring is a 2019 Malaysian Cantonese-language musical comedy film. The film tells the story of an arrogant young heir who tries to acquire the Dadi Village in the present, but accidentally travels back to a stranger and funnier version of Dadi Village in the past.

The film is released on 5 February 2019 in Malaysia.

Synopsis 
In order to take over the position of the group chairman with his mother's approval, the proud and arrogant Liang Minshan (Cedric Loo) decided to accept the challenge of acquiring the Dadi Village. When acquiring the village, he accidentally fell and collapsed, only to waking up in the mountains, having been traveled back to a strange Dadi Village in the old times. Most of the villagers there were old people, can he succeed in acquiring and go back to the present?

Production 
The production team build the set for Dadi Village in Bandar Bukit Puchong, Selangor, spending more than 1 million ringgit. The film uses a lot of extras which includes seniors, kids and animals. The film budget is reportedly 4.5 million.

Fire accident 
On September 17, 2018, a fire broke out at the village during the shooting of a fire scene. When the crew used gasoline to burn the wooden houses, one of the houses' went out of control and in 2 seconds, the accident was invoked. Firemen on duty quickly put out the fire. Actors including Sharon Yeung, Joey Leong and more than 20 extras who played the villagers were injured and admitted to the hospital. Yeung has sustained 7% of second-degree burns on the left side of her face but did not leave scars; Leong had 5% of second-degree burns on both her legs and has since recovered. In the following days, some of the actors remained at the hospital for treatment, while some was approved for discharge. Director Nick Wong and producer Jack Lim apologized and expressed respect to the cast members, and has applied for insurance and compensation.

References

External links 
 
 Amazing Spring on Cinema.com.my

Malaysian musical comedy films
Cantonese-language Malaysian films
2019 comedy films